The Instability index is a measure of proteins, used to determine whether it will be stable in a test tube.

If the index is less than 40, then it is probably stable in the test tube. If it is greater (for example, enaptin) then it is probably not stable.

References
 
The instability index is also used to calculate risk in agriculture.

External links
 ProtParam on ExPASy, computes the instability index of a protein sequence 
 ProtParam documentation

Proteomics